The beach scaly-toed gecko (Lepidodactylus pantai) is a species of gecko. It is endemic to the Maluku Islands in Indonesia and was first described in 2017.

References

Lepidodactylus
Reptiles described in 2017
Endemic fauna of Indonesia
Reptiles of Indonesia